Cherokee County is a county in the U.S. state of South Carolina. As of the 2020 census, the population was 56,216. The county seat is Gaffney. The county was formed in 1897 from parts of York, Union, and Spartanburg Counties. It was named for the Cherokee people who historically occupied this area prior to European encounter.

Cherokee County comprises the Gaffney, SC Micropolitan Statistical Area, which is also included in the Greenville-Spartanburg-Anderson, SC Combined Statistical Area.

History
This area was occupied for thousands of years by indigenous peoples and by the historic Cherokee people before the arrival of Europeans.

When European traders and settlers entered the area, they used the existing Native American paths: called collectively the Trading Path. The Upper Road and Lower Cherokee Traders Path were paths that passed through the piedmont. The former connected to Fredericksburg, Virginia, leading from the Virginia Tidewater, into the Piedmont, and continue down further South.

The Lower Cherokee Traders Path especially connected areas in present-day western North Carolina, upstate South Carolina and northeastern Georgia. In the mid-18th century, waves of British migrants and immigrants, an estimated 250,000 people, traveled by these paths into Cherokee and neighboring counties in the piedmont. This backcountry area was initially settled especially by immigrant Ulster Scots people, along with Germans and Anglo-Americans migrating into the area. Up until the mid-19th century, plantations were developed in the county. Enslaved African-Americans, for their labor, and as “property,” were the basis of the county’s economy until the end of the Civil War.

During the American Revolutionary War, the Battle of Cowpens was fought on January 17, 1781, in northwestern Cherokee County, north of the town of Cowpens, South Carolina, an engagement in the American Revolution's southern theatre resulting in a Patriot victory.

Geography 

It is the third-smallest county in South Carolina by land area and fourth-smallest by total area.

Mountain peaks 
 Draytonville Mountain
 Brown's Mountain
 Thicketty Mountain
 Whitaker Mountain
Draytonville Mountain is known to locals as McKown's Mountain, named for a farmer who owned much of the land in that area.

Major water bodies 
 Broad River
 McKowns Creek
 Pacolet River

National protected areas 
 Cowpens National Battlefield
 Kings Mountain National Military Park (part)
 Overmountain Victory National Historic Trail (part)

State and local protected areas/sites 
 Magness-Humphries House
 Peachoid

Adjacent counties 
 Cleveland County, North Carolina – north
 York County – east
 Union County – south
 Spartanburg County – west
 Rutherford County, North Carolina – northwest

Transportation 
The lifeline of Cherokee County, I-85, runs through the city limits of Gaffney. It carries traffic and trade contributing to the business development along Floyd Baker Blvd, the county's main thoroughfare, which bisects I-85. Much of the county's growth occurs along I-85.

With no airports of its own, Cherokee County is served by Charlotte/Douglas International Airport and Greenville-Spartanburg International Airport. A study to determine the feasibility of building an airport in the county revealed that an airport is desperately needed by businesses. Previous studies have determined the structure of the airport and possible airport sites have been narrowed down to two sites – one located just south of Gaffney and one located outside of Blacksburg. A major economic feasibility study is now being conducted, as required for funding by the federal government. If the airport is economically viable, the government could contribute 95% of the funds needed to construct the airport, if the project is authorized by Congress. If the study fails, then no federal funding will be provided.

Major highways 
 
 
 
 
 
 
 
 
 
 
  (Near Draytonville)
  (Saratt)

Demographics

2020 census

As of the 2020 United States census, there were 56,216 people, 20,699 households, and 11,592 families residing in the county.

2010 census
As of the 2010 United States Census, there were 55,342 people, 21,519 households, and 14,941 families residing in the county. The racial makeup of the county was 75.0% white, 20.4% black or African American, 0.6% Asian, 0.4% American Indian, 2.2% from other races, and 1.4% from two or more races. Those of Hispanic or Latino origin made up 3.7% of the population. In terms of ancestry, 14.7% were American, 9.7% were Irish, 6.6% were English, and 6.5% were German.

Of the 21,519 households, 35.1% had children under the age of 18 living with them, 46.2% were married couples living together, 17.4% had a female householder with no husband present, 30.6% were non-families, and 25.8% of all households were made up of individuals. The average household size was 2.54 and the average family size was 3.03. The median age was 38.3 years.

The median income for a household in the county was $34,132 and the median income for a family was $46,164. Males had a median income of $39,048 versus $27,390 for females. The per capita income for the county was $17,862. About 14.3% of families and 19.5% of the population were below the poverty line, including 27.5% of those under age 18 and 11.0% of those age 65 or over.

2000 census
As of the census of 2000, there were 52,537 people, 20,495 households, and 14,612 families residing in the county.  The population density was 134 people per square mile (52/km2).  There were 22,400 housing units at an average density of 57 per square mile (22/km2).  The racial makeup of the county was 76.92% White, 20.56% Black or African American, 0.20% Native American, 0.31% Asian, 0.02% Pacific Islander, 1.16% from other races, and 0.84% from two or more races.  2.08% of the population were Hispanic or Latino of any race. 39.1% were of "American", 6.8% Irish, 5.8% English and 5.6% German ancestry according to Census 2000.  Most of those claiming "American" ancestry are of Scots-Irish and/or English descent, but have family who have been in the country for so long, that they no longer differentiate such national origins and choose to identify simply as "American".

There were 20,495 households, out of which 32.70% had children under the age of 18 living with them, 51.30% were married couples living together, 15.40% had a female householder with no husband present, and 28.70% were non-families. 25.00% of all households were made up of individuals, and 9.40% had someone living alone who was 65 years of age or older.  The average household size was 2.53 and the average family size was 3.01.

In the county, the population was spread out, with 25.80% under the age of 18, 9.00% from 18 to 24, 29.60% from 25 to 44, 23.20% from 45 to 64, and 12.40% who were 65 years of age or older.  The median age was 35 years. For every 100 females there were 93.80 males.  For every 100 females age 18 and over, there were 90.70 males.

The median income for a household in the county was $33,787, and the median income for a family was $39,393. Males had a median income of $30,984 versus $21,298 for females. The per capita income for the county was $16,421.  About 11.00% of families and 23.90% of the population were below the poverty line, including 16.90% of those under age 18 and 15.20% of those age 65 or over.

Government and politics

Economy
Cherokee County is the only county to have three national parks within its boundaries: the Overmountain Victory National Historic Trail, Kings Mountain National Military Park and Cowpens National Battlefield. Several historic homes dot the landscape of Cherokee County. While many are not generally open to the public, several annual tours of these homes take place.

Gaffney Little Theatre and Limestone College serve theater enthusiasts, offering plays and musicals ten to twelve times a year.

A major shopping center is Prime Outlets-Gaffney, which attracts almost 3,000,000 visitors per year, and contains over 80 retail outlets. Floyd Baker Boulevard is a major commercial area in Gaffney. It has numerous stores and restaurants. Uptown Gaffney offers many upscale boutiques, shops and cafes.

The area's newest attraction is the Cherokee County History and Arts Museum. It is located at the old Central School. Cherokee County's history, its contributions to the arts, and its role in shaping the culture of the southeast are explored.

Nuclear power plant 
In 2002, the President George W. Bush administration initiated the Nuclear Power 2010 Program, to encourage development of nuclear power plants to meet energy needs. The program developed streamlining of approval processes for licensing and had subsidies. Additional incentives were authorized under the Nuclear Power Act of 2005.

On March 16, 2006 Duke Power announced that a Cherokee County site had been selected for a potential new nuclear power plant, to be called the William States Lee III Nuclear Generating Station, informally known as Lee Station.  The site is jointly owned by Duke Power and Southern Company.  Duke plans to develop the site for two Westinghouse Electric Company AP1000 (advanced passive) pressurized water reactors.  Each reactor is capable of producing approximately 1,117 megawatts. (See Nuclear Power 2010 Program.) This site is adjacent to the old Cherokee Nuclear Power Plant site, which was never completed and ultimately abandoned. It was used by James Cameron as a set for the 1989 film The Abyss.

On December 14, 2007 Duke Power submitted a Combined Construction and Operating License to the Nuclear Regulatory Commission, with an announcement that it will spend $160 million in 2008 on the plant with a total cost of 5–6 billion dollars. Due to a slowdown in licensing and increase in costs, a federal license for what is estimated to be an $11 billion plant is not expected until 2016. Duke Energy will decide after that point whether to go forward with construction. In August 2017, Duke Energy announced that construction plans at the site had been put on an indefinite hold. The company retains the rights to restart construction in the future.

Healthcare 
Gaffney is home to several healthcare institutions:

Cherokee Medical Center 
Cherokee Medical Center, a division of Spartanburg Regional Healthcare System, is a 125-bed acute care facility located in Gaffney, S.C., that services Cherokee County and the surrounding areas. The hospital provides services including emergency, medical, surgical and imaging. Formerly Gaffney Medical Center, the hospital joined Mary Black Health System in 2015 and became Mary Black Health System – Gaffney. Mary Black facilities became part of Spartanburg Regional Healthcare System in 2019.

Gibbs Cancer Center and Research Institute at Gaffney 
Based in Spartanburg, Gibbs Cancer Center & Research Institute provides comprehensive cancer care to the Upstate South Carolina community and beyond. One of four locations, Gibbs at Gaffney opened in September 2011 with the mission of providing oncology services to the Cherokee County community.

Gibbs at Gaffney provides medical oncology and infusion services.

Immediate Care Center – Gaffney 
Located on Floyd Baker Boulevard, Immediate Care Center – Gaffney provides a hybrid of urgent and primary care.

Medical Group of the Carolinas 
A network of more than 100 practices in Upstate South Carolina, Medical Group of the Carolinas includes several medical practices in Cherokee County. The local offices include family and internal medicine, cardiology, orthopaedics, hematology oncology, urology and women's care.

Communities

Cities
 Chesnee (partly in Spartanburg County)
 Gaffney (county seat and largest city)

Towns
 Blacksburg
 Smyrna (mostly in York County)

Census-designated places
 Cherokee Falls
 East Gaffney

Other unincorporated communities
 Cashion Crossroads
 Draytonville
 Goucher
 Grassy Pond
 Kings Creek
 Macedonia
 State Line
 Thicketty

Ghost towns 

 Ezell

See also
 List of counties in South Carolina
 National Register of Historic Places listings in Cherokee County, South Carolina
 National Park Service
 Tryon County, North Carolina

References

External links

 
 
 Cherokee County Chamber of Commerce
 Cherokee County Historical & Preservation Society
 Cherokee County history and images

 
South Carolina placenames of Native American origin
1897 establishments in South Carolina
Populated places established in 1897
Counties of Appalachia